The Othon was a military 430-ton paddle steamer of the Hellenic Navy, named after the first king of independent Greece, Otto. It was designed by naval architect Georgios Tombazis and built in 1838 at the Poros Naval Shipyard. It was powered by 2 Maudslay Sons & Field 120 hp steam engines, and was armed with two 18 pounder long guns and four 32 pounder carronades; total crew was 59 (officers and men). The ship was renamed Athinai ("Athens") after Otto's ousting in 1862 and decommissioned in 1864.

Bibliography

External links 

1838 ships
Naval ships of Greece
Ships built in Greece
Steamships of Greece